Artem Khomula (born 19 May 1995) is a Ukrainian judoka.

He is the bronze medalist of the 2019 Judo Grand Prix Tel Aviv in the -73 kg category.

References

External links
 
 
 

1995 births
Living people
Ukrainian male judoka
Judoka at the 2015 European Games
Judoka at the 2019 European Games
European Games medalists in judo
European Games bronze medalists for Ukraine
21st-century Ukrainian people